A public health crisis in and around the city of Jackson, Mississippi, began in late August 2022 after the Pearl River flooded due to severe storms in the state. The flooding caused the O. B. Curtis Water Treatment Plant, the city's largest water treatment facility, which was already running on backup pumps due to failures the month prior, to stop the treatment of drinking water indefinitely. This resulted in approximately 150,000 residents of the city being left without access to safe drinking water. Mississippi Governor Tate Reeves issued a state of emergency and United States President Joe Biden declared a federal disaster to trigger federal aid. Reeves withdrew the state of emergency on November 22. The crisis triggered a political debate regarding racial discrimination, infrastructure neglect, and shifting local demographics.

Background

Jackson water system 
Jackson is the largest city in the U.S. state of Mississippi. Its water system includes more than 71,000 water connections and supplies water over about 150 square miles of territory, including the city of Jackson, the city of Byram, various other locations in Hinds County, and an automobile factory near Canton. In addition to Jackson, the municipal sewer system serves sections of Hinds, Rankin and Madison counties. The system draws water from the Ross Barnett Reservoir and the Pearl River. The reservoir water is treated by the O. B. Curtis Water Treatment Plant, while the river water is treated by the J.H. Fewell Water Treatment Plant. The city also maintains two groundwater wells for supply. Sewage is treated by three treatment plants.

Financial issues and treatment problems 
The city's drinking water treatment system had problems for years before the crisis. In 2010, a winter storm caused several water main breaks and a widespread outage. City hospitals increased privately-owned well capacity as a response to that emergency, and as a result in the August 2022 crisis core medical services were able to continue operating with running water. In 2012, Jackson failed a U.S. Environmental Protection Agency (EPA) inspection enforcing Safe Drinking Water Act standards, resulting in a November 2012 settlement requiring that the city improve maintenance. Several efforts by city officials in the aftermath of the 2010 storm to secure money for improvements by bond issues and local option sales taxes were blocked or reduced in size by state officials.

In February 2021, a winter storm shut down the O. B. Curtis Water Treatment Plant, leaving residents without water for a month. City leaders asked the state for $47 million for sewer repairs, but received only $3 million. The city and the EPA agreed on a repair plan in July 2021, but the city's water infrastructure continued to deteriorate. Residents complained of low water pressure and sewage floating in the streets. The city issued many boil water orders after the February storm.

A private contractor failed to send water bills to thousands of residents, and the governor vetoed an amnesty plan in 2020, but not in 2021. This action allowed the city to recover partial payments from some customers. In December 2021, the Environmental Protection Agency announced an allocation of $74.9 million from the Infrastructure Investment and Jobs Act to Mississippi for water infrastructure improvements.
Mayor Chokwe Antar Lumumba estimated the cost of fully repairing the water system at $2 billion.

From 2017 to 2021, Jackson recorded an annual average of 55 breaks per 100 miles of water line, higher than the "safe" rate of 15 breaks or less. In July 2022, the EPA completed a report which detailed numerous issues with the municipal water utility including understaffing, high employee turnover, malfunctioning water meters, and an inability to properly issue bills to all customers. The city informed the EPA that it estimated that 50 percent of the water it supplied did not result in any revenue, either due to faulty metering or loss of water in the system. By the time of the water crisis, Jackson had about $191 million outstanding revenue bond debt for its water utility, and the utility's bonds had been rated at junk status. Due to the lack of requisite funding and staff, the city did not record water pressure over time, did not regularly flush its lines, did not maintain valves and hydrants, and did not cycle water through storage tanks to maintain appropriate chlorine levels.

In July 2022, damage inflicted at the Curtis treatment plant forced the water utility to switch to backup pumps. As a result, Jackson issued a boil water advisory on July 28. The order was still in effect when the August 2022 flooding arrived. In wake of the advisory, municipal officials in Byram began exploring the creation on an independent water utility for their city.

Flooding 

Heavy rain fell over parts of Mississippi the week prior to the crisis, with Walnut Grove observing  of precipitation. These storms caused flash flooding in the area, including Jackson, where Mayor Lumumba declared a local emergency on August 24. One home in Jackson was flooded and a few neighborhoods were evacuated as a precaution. The flooding led the Curtis plant to take an influx of water from the Barnett Reservoir. As a result, treatment methods were altered and the plant produced less clean water, causing pressure in the system to drop.

Emergency 

On August 29, 2022, Governor of Mississippi Tate Reeves declared the O. B. Curtis Water Treatment Plant on the verge of failure, and the state assumed control of its operations. Problems with pumps at the Fewell Plant meant that the city could not use it make up for the drop in water production from Curtis while repairs were underway there. The following day, most Jackson residents did not receive running water, and Reeves issued a state of emergency. He deployed 600 members of the Mississippi National Guard on August 31 to help distribute bottled water and hand sanitizer. At Reeves' request, President Joe Biden declared Jackson to be a disaster area, allowing the Federal Emergency Management Agency to send resources to the city and to help pay for the response.

The lack of water forced many stores and restaurants in Jackson to close, while local schools and universities moved to virtual learning. Other Mississippi communities organized drives to donate water and other supplies to the city's residents and offered accommodations for some people displaced by the crisis. Most of the city's hospitals had independent water supplies and were not affected by the crisis. The exception, Merit Health Central, used water brought in by trucks to remain operational, a practice it had initiated when the July boil advisory was issued.

A well dug at the Mississippi Fairgrounds after the 2021 crisis was used to source emergency water locally. Rented pumps were used to increase water pressure, and the city considered using a contractor or retired operators to deal with a chronic staffing shortage.

On September 4, Jackson officials announced that they had restored adequate water pressure to most of the system. The following day Governor Reeves said that conditions at the water treatment plant had improved with the pumped out water being much cleaner. For long term solutions, Reeves stated that the state was considering a range of solutions, including privatization of the system and forming a commission to oversee failed water systems. On September 15, Jackson's water supply was fully restored and the boil advisory was withdrawn, though the state Department of Health still advised precautions for pregnant women and children.

On September 19, the Curtis plant suffered a chlorine leak, leading the staff to evacuate the facility for a few hours. On September 26, Jackson officials issued a new boil advisory for 1,200 water customers. Of these, 1,000 were in Byram, where a contractor had accidentally broken a water line. The rest were in north Jackson, Belhaven, and Eastover, who were impacted by over 200 breaks in various water lines due to increasing water pressure in the system. On September 27, officials stated they were experiencing significant water leaks throughout system, and overall water production was at a stable level at the O.B. Curtis plant. On October 20, the City of Jackson, collaborating with the U.S. Department of Justice and the EPA, released a Request for Proposals for bids on the operation, maintenance, and management of the Curtis and Fewell water treatment plants, tanks and well facilities, as a one-year emergency agreement.

On October 31, the EPA declared that water being treated at both the Curtis and Fewell plants was safe to drink. On November 22, Reeves withdrew the state of emergency.

Aftermath 
Another boil water advisory had to be issued in late December 2022, when a winter storm froze and burst pipes in the city distribution system.

Political debate 
The water crisis triggered a political debate regarding racial discrimination, infrastructure neglect, and shifting local demographics. Some commentators have charged the failing water system is an example of environmental racism, with the state failing to support infrastructure in its capital city. Critics point to Jackson's presence as a Democratic-leaning city with an overwhelming African American majority population in a Republican state with a white majority state legislature. Shifting demographics in the late-20th and early-21st century, including white flight, reduced the city population, decreased the number of white residents as a proportion of the population, and led to an increase in the city's poverty rate. Wealthier suburbs have newer infrastructure, but Jackson itself is left with a smaller tax base to support its aging system. Governor Reeves, a Republican, started holding press conferences when the August 2022 crisis began without inviting Lumumba, the city's Democratic mayor.

Michael Guest, a Republican congressman representing parts of Jackson, pushed back on such criticism by placing the blame on political gridlock among the city's leadership. Reeves criticized Jackson for having longstanding issues regarding billing and staffing and for not coming up with a plan for recovery following previous events. Congressman Bennie Thompson, a Democrat who represents the parts of Jackson in the U.S. House of Representatives not in Guest's district, said on September 2 that if the city cannot demonstrate an ability to manage the water system adequately, they should not have the authority to do so.

The crisis has also spurred discussion about how climate change is expected to strain existing infrastructure in the United States. Writing for the American socialist publication Jacobin, Ryan Zickgraf states that the water crisis in Jackson can be attributed to decades of austerity and capital disinvestment.

See also
 Flint water crisis
 Water supply and sanitation in the United States

References

2022 disasters in the United States
2022 in Mississippi
August 2022 events in the United States
Water crisis
September 2022 events in the United States
Water in Mississippi
Water supply and sanitation in the United States